Mississippi state elections in 2020 were held on Tuesday, November 3, 2020. Its primaries were held on March 10, 2020, with runoffs taking place on June 23.

In addition to the U.S. presidential race, Mississippi voters elected the Class II U.S. Senator from Mississippi, all of Mississippi's seats to the House of Representatives, and 4 of 9 seats on the Mississippi Supreme Court. They also voted on three ballot measures.

Federal offices

President of the United States

Mississippi has 6 electoral votes in the Electoral College.

United States Class II Senate Seat

United States House of Representatives

There are 3 U.S. Representatives in Mississippi that will be up for election in addition to 1 open seat.

State Judiciary
All four incumbents whose seats are up for reelection are running again.

Ballot Measures

Polling
On Initiative 65 and Alternative 65A (collectively, Measure 1)

On Whether Medical Marijuana Should Be Legal

On Measure 2

On Measure 3

Legalization of medical marijuana
Legalization of medical marijuana comes with two choices for voters. The first vote is for the approval of either initiative or neither. The following choice is between either 65 or 65A. Voting for Initiative 65 supports approving the medical marijuana amendment as provided by Initiative 65, which would allow medical marijuana treatment for 22 specified qualifying conditions, allow individuals to possess up to 2.5 ounces of marijuana at one time, and tax marijuana sales at the current state sales tax rate of 7%.
Voting for Alternative 65A supports approving the legislature's alternative medical marijuana amendment, which would restrict smoking marijuana to terminally ill patients; require pharmaceutical-grade marijuana products and treatment oversight by licensed physicians, nurses, and pharmacists; and leave tax rates, possession limits, and certain other details to be set by the legislature.

Initiative 65 would legalize possession of up to 2.5 ounces (71 g) of medical marijuana for people with 22 kinds of pre-existing conditions. It would also implement a tax for medical marijuana, allow its consumption in all but public places, cap the cost for medical marijuana ID cards at $50 per card, issue these cards by August 15, 2021, and delegate administration of medical marijuana to the state Department of Health. Alternative 65A would legalize possession of an as of yet unspecified amount of medical marijuana for terminally ill patients with as-of-yet unspecified pre-existing conditions, would not necessarily delegate responsibility for administration to the state Department of Health, would not cap costs for medical marijuana ID cards, would not set a tax rate for the substance and would not set a deadline by which cards had to be issued.

Elimination of state electoral college
A "yes" vote supports the following: removing the requirement that a candidate for governor or elected state office receive the most votes in a majority of the state's 122 House of Representatives districts (the electoral vote requirement), removing the role of the Mississippi House of Representatives in choosing a winner if no candidate receives majority approval, and providing that a candidate for governor or state office must receive a majority vote of the people to win and that a runoff election will be held between the two highest vote-getters if no candidate receives a majority vote.

A "no" vote opposes this amendment to establish runoff elections for governor and state offices, thereby maintaining the electoral vote requirement and that the House of Representatives will vote for a winner if no candidate receives a majority or in the event of a tie.

Approval of new state flag design

Voters may vote either yes to adopt the new flag or no to oppose adopting the new state flag. If the new proposed flag is rejected by voters, the commission to Redesign the Mississippi State Flag will reconvene, design another flag, and allow voters to approve or reject it at a special election in November 2021.

See also
 Voter suppression in the United States 2019–2020: Mississippi
 Bilingual elections requirement for Mississippi (per Voting Rights Act Amendments of 2006)

Notes

References

External links
 
 
  (State affiliate of the U.S. League of Women Voters)
 

 
Mississippi